Titus Lucretius Tricipitinus was a politician and military leader in the early days of the Roman Republic. Twice, in the years 508 and 504 BC, he was elected Roman Consul, alongside Publius Valerius Poplicola. Also a military leader, he was victorious against Lars Porsena during his first consulate.  According to Livy, he led the Roman army together with Valerius against the Sabines in 504 BC and both consuls were awarded the honour of a triumph, however the Fasti Triumphales only mention the triumph of Valerius, in May 504 BC.

During the war between Rome and Clusium, Lucretius participated in a successful sally organised by Valerius, killing a Clusian raiding party.

The stories of Titus and his exploits may in part be mythical.

See also
 Lucretia gens

References

6th-century BC Roman consuls
Tricipitinus, Titus